Ren Haiyan (born 18 October 1980), known by her pen name Tong Hua or Zhang Xiaosan, is a Chinese contemporary romance novelist and screenwriter. She graduated from Peking University and emigrated to America in 2005. She currently lives in New York City.

Works

Novels

Screenplays

References
Tong Hua's weibo address:http://t.qq.com/tonghua_tonghua (QQ)  
http://weibo.com/xiaosanju (sina)

1980 births
Living people
American romantic fiction novelists
American writers of Chinese descent
Chinese emigrants to the United States
Chinese screenwriters
Peking University alumni
Screenwriters from New York (state)
 
Women romantic fiction writers
Writers from New York City
21st-century pseudonymous writers
Pseudonymous women writers